Jill Mitwell is an American television soap opera director. Mitwell gave the acceptance speech for One Life to Live winning the Daytime Emmy Award for the directing team in 2008.

Directing credits

All My Children  Occasional Director (2001)
As the World Turns Director (1987–1991; 1998–1999)
Guiding Light Director (Early 1980s)
One Life to Live Director (1992–1998; 2000–2006; 2006–January 2012)
 "Remember WENN"  Director (1997)

Awards and nominations
Daytime Emmy Award
Win, 2014, Directing, "One Life to Live" (online reboot)
Win, 2009, Directing, "One Life to Live"
Win, 2008, Directing, "One Life to "Live"
Nominated, 2007, Directing, One Life to Live
Nominated, 2004, Directing, One Life to Live
Nominated, 1995, Directing, One Life to Live
Nominated, 1992, Directing, As the World Turns
Nominated, 1990, Directing, As the World Turns
Nominated, 1989, Directing, As the World Turns
Nominated, 1988, Directing, As the World Turns

Directors Guild of America Award
Win, 2013, Directing, "One Life to Live", episode "Between Heaven and Hell"
Nomination, 2010, Directing, "One Life to Live", episode 10,688
Win, 2007, Directing, One Life to Live, (episode #9779)
Nomination, 2002, Directing, One Life to Live, (episode #8691)
Win, 2000, Directing, One Life to Live, (episode #8205)
Nomination, 1999, Directing, One Life to Live, (episode #8012)
Nomination, 1998, Directing, One Life to Live, (episode #7761)
Nomination, 1996, Directing, One Life to Live, (episode #7285)
Win, 1993, Directing, One Life to Live, (episode #6356)

External links

American television directors
American women television directors
Living people
Place of birth missing (living people)
Year of birth missing (living people)
Directors Guild of America Award winners
Daytime Emmy Award winners